The men's 30 kilometre pursuit (15 km classical + 15 km freestyle) at the FIS Nordic World Ski Championships 2007 took place on 24 February 2007 at the Shirahatayama Open Stadium.

Results

References

External links
Final results International Ski Federation (FIS)

FIS Nordic World Ski Championships 2007